Brian Mitchell (born 30 August 1961 in Johannesburg, South Africa) is a South Aftican former professional boxer who competed from 1981 to 1985. He held the WBA super-featherweight title from 1986 to 1991, ''The Ring super-featherweight title from 1986 to 1988, and the IBF super-featherweight title from 1991 to 1992.

Beginnings
Mitchell began his career in late 1981, winning his first three fights on points over four rounds in less than two months. By the end of November he had won five times, defeating Simon Zondo and then Mose Mthiyane on fourth-round knockouts.

He began 1982 with a two-round KO of Phanuel Mosoane, but then suffered a setback, losing over 10 rounds to Jacob Morake. It would prove to be the only loss of his career, and left Mitchell's record at six wins and one defeat.

He won his next two fights, one on points and one by knockout, but was then held to a draw over six rounds by Frank Khonkhobe. In October 1982, he met Khonkhobe in a rematch and won on a 10-round decision.

In March 1983 Mitchell won an eight-round decision from Jerome Gumede, earning him a South African junior-lightweight title shot at Chris Whiteboy. He made the most of his opportunity, knocking Whiteboy out in the ninth round to claim the title. Bashew Sibaca lasted 10 rounds as Mitchell defended his crown, but Graham Gcola lasted just two rounds. 
Mitchell then met Jacob Morake, the only boxer to have beaten him in his young career. He won a points decision over 12 rounds. Fighting Frank Khonkhobe for the third time, Mitchell recorded a points victory. He finished 1983 with a first-round KO win over Blessing Ndlele.

Morake faced Mitchell for the third time in March 1984, and the champion again defended his South African title over 12 rounds. He then disposed of Carlos Miguel Rodriguez in four rounds, and won on points against Iland Matthews over six rounds. Nika Khumalo lasted only two rounds in his title challenge, and Mitchell then outpointed Aladin Stevens over eight rounds. 
Mitchell opened 1985 with a three-round KO win over Nyungi Mtiya, and then posted two seventh-round knockout wins in succession, defeating Carlos Rodriguez and Vicente Jorge. He improved his record to 25 wins, one loss and one draw when he beat Job Sisanga on points over eight rounds.

In his next bout, in November 1985, he faced Jacob Morake for the fourth time. It proved to be a tragic fight. Mitchell won on a twelfth-round KO, but Morake had absorbed a terrible amount of punishment and later died of head injuries.

Mitchell returned to the ring in March 1986, knocking out Julio Ruiz in six rounds at Sun City. In June of the same year, he defended his South African junior-lightweight title against Bushy Mosoeu, winning on points over 12 rounds.

World title
In September he was given a crack at Alfredo Layne's world junior lightweight title in Sun City, South Africa. Mitchell seized his chance, dropping the Panamanian champion three times in the tenth round to win the title by knock-out. 
He next travelled to San Juan to tackle Jose Rivera, and after a tough battle emerged with a draw over 15 rounds. Less than two months later, he knocked out Aurelio Benitez in two rounds in a non-title bout. On 31 July, he faced Francisco Fernandez in Panama City and, with his excellent conditioning to the fore, knocked out the challenger in the fourteenth round. 
Mitchell was next in action in Gravelines, France, where he defeated Daniel Londas on points. He finished the year in Capo d'Orlando, Italy, with a ninth-round knockout of Salvatore Curcetti.

Mitchell took on Jose Rivera for the second time in April 1988 in Madrid. He again defended his title over the distance. In a non-title match he decisioned Danilo Cabrera over 10 rounds, and then outpointed Jim McDonnell over 12 rounds to defend his title for the sixth time.

In 1989 Mitchell headed to Italy, where he knocked out Salvatore Bottiglieri in eight rounds. Fighting in Italy once more, he saw off the challenge of Jackie Beard, and then disposed of his namesake, Irving Mitchell, in seven rounds in the USA. In his final fight of 1989, Mitchell defeated Felipe Orozco on points in a non-title match.

The following year he faced Beard again, winning a 12-round points decision in Italy. He then defeated Frank Mitchell, also over the distance, to maintain his hold on the junior-lightweight title.

In 1991 Mitchell travelled to Sacramento to face local hero Tony "The Tiger" Lopez arguably the toughest foe of his career. In a hometown decision that shocked boxing experts, Lopez managed to draw with Mitchell. The South African boxer was stripped of his WBA crown for facing Lopez for the IBF title, and suddenly he found himself without a world title for the first time since 1986. 
However, he again faced Lopez in Sacramento in September, and on that occasion made sure of victory with a convincing points win, claiming the IBF title in the process.

Mitchell retired from boxing after that fight, but came out of retirement for two more victories in 1994 and 1995 before permanently retiring from the ring.

He finished his career with 45 wins, a solitary loss and three draws. His 12 successful defences of the junior–lightweight title was only eclipsed by his countryman Vuyani Bungu who achieved the record of thirteen successful defences.

In rankings based on the formula of "the man who beat the man", Mitchell was rated the world's best junior-lightweight boxer from 1986 to his retirement in 1991. He proved his toughness by making 12 title defences on the road, and he proved his ability time after time when fighting for the world title.
 
Many South Africans would consider him the country's greatest ever pugilist. Today, he is one of South Africa's foremost boxing trainers.

Mitchell was inducted into the International Boxing Hall of Fame in 2009, and notwithstanding his exit from the amateur ranks in the early 80's, he was awarded honorary Springbok colours at a box–and-dine evening held at the Johannesburg City Hall in April 1989.

Professional boxing record

References

External links

Brian Mitchell - CBZ Profile

1961 births
Living people
International Boxing Hall of Fame inductees
International Boxing Federation champions
World Boxing Association champions
Boxers from Johannesburg
South African male boxers
Super-featherweight boxers